Justin Scott is an American novelist. Scott sometimes uses the pseudonyms Paul Garrison and J. S. Blazer.

Early life 
Scott was born in Manhattan, New York City, New York, U.S. Scott's father was A. Leslie Scott, a novelist. Scott's mother, Lily K. Scott, was also a novelist. Scott grew up on Long Island's Great South Bay. 
His sister, Alison Scott Skelton, is also a novelist.

Career 
Scott has written fourteen books under his own name, including the Ben Abbott Mystery series. He has written seven books under the pseudonym Paul Garrison and two under the pseudonym J. S. Blazer. He has coauthored ten books with Clive Cussler. These are the first ten books of the Isaac Bell series.

Bibliography

Books authored solely by Justin Scott

Under pen name Paul Garrison

Under pen name J. S. Blazer

Books written with Clive Cussler

Reference

References

Living people
20th-century American novelists
21st-century American novelists
American adventure novelists
Writers from Manhattan
American male novelists
20th-century American male writers
21st-century American male writers
Novelists from New York (state)
Year of birth missing (living people)